Ira Angustain (born August 6, 1958, in Glendale, California) is an American actor best known for his roles as Ricardo "Go Go" Gomez on The White Shadow and as Freddie Prinze in the made-for-TV movie Can You Hear the Laughter? The Story of Freddie Prinze.  Angustain left acting shortly thereafter and became vice-president for a maintenance company and part-time screenwriter.

Today, Angustain is an ordained minister in Orange County, California.

Filmography

References

External links

Male actors from Glendale, California
American male television actors
1958 births
Living people
American male film actors
American male screenwriters
American Pentecostal pastors
Screenwriters from California